Roger Bigelow Merriman (24 May 1876 – 7 September 1945) was an American historian and a practitioner of scientific historiography developed by German historians. He is known especially for his multivolume history of the Spanish Empire.

Biography
Roger Bigelow Merriman was the only child of Daniel Merriman, minister of the Central Congregational Church in Worcester, Massachusetts, and the artist and art collector Helen Bigelow Merriman. His maternal grandfather was Erastus Brigham Bigelow, an inventor of weaving machinery.

Merriman entered Harvard University as an undergraduate in 1892, earning both an A.B. and an M.A. degree. He went on to spend two years (1897–99) studying history at Oxford University, finishing with a B.Litt degree. He obtained his Ph.D. from Harvard in 1902 and that same year published his biography of Cromwell, which he considered "as apprentice work."  In 1902 Merriman was elected a member of the American Antiquarian Society.

Merriman taught at Harvard for many years. He was initially hired in 1902 as an instructor and was later promoted to assistant professor (1908) and full professor (1918). He served for a time as master of Eliot House. In 1925-36, he was a visiting professor at the Sorbonne in France. He received a number of honorary doctorates.

The course he taught on the Spanish Empire gave the impetus for his research and voluminous publication on the topic. His four-volume work The Rise of the Spanish Empire (1918-1934) is recognized as a pioneering work in the field of Latin American history. Its main thesis is that "the Spanish Empire, unlike its British rival, was the natural continuation of Spain's medieval history." One assessment of his work is that "Merriman will always be a historian's historian," and his work never found public favor. "In the long run, one feels, the reputation of Roger Merriman is secure in the hands of his fellow historians."

Works
The Life and Letters of Thomas Cromwell (London, 1902)
The Rise of the Spanish Empire (4 vols., 1918–34)
Suleiman the Magnificent 1520-1566 (Cambridge, Mass., 1944)

Personal life
Merriman married Dorothea Foote, and they had four children: Roger, Daniel, Dorothea, and Helen.

References

1876 births
1945 deaths
20th-century American historians
American male non-fiction writers
Historians of Latin America
Harvard University alumni
Harvard University faculty
Latin Americanists
Historians of Spain
Members of the American Antiquarian Society
20th-century American male writers